In enzymology, a carboxymethylhydantoinase is an enzyme that catalyzes the chemical reaction

L-5-carboxymethylhydantoin + H2O  N-carbamoyl-L-aspartate

Thus, the two substrates of this enzyme are L-5-carboxymethylhydantoin and H2O, whereas its product is N-carbamoyl-L-aspartate.

This enzyme belongs to the family of hydrolases, those acting on carbon-nitrogen bonds other than peptide bonds, specifically in cyclic amides.  The systematic name of this enzyme class is L-5-carboxymethylhydantoin amidohydrolase. This enzyme is also called hydantoin hydrolase.

References

 

EC 3.5.2
Enzymes of unknown structure